In mathematics, and in particular ordinary differential equations, a Green's matrix helps to determine a particular solution to a first-order inhomogeneous linear system of ODEs.  The concept is named after George Green.

Now let  be  linearly independent solutions to the homogeneous equation  and arrange them in columns to form a fundamental matrix:

This fundamental matrix will provide the homogeneous solution, and if added to a particular solution will give the general solution to the inhomogeneous equation.

Let  be the general solution. Now,

This implies  or  where  is an arbitrary constant vector.

Now the general solution is 

The first term is the homogeneous solution and the second term is the particular solution.

Now define the Green's matrix 

The particular solution can now be written

External links
An example  of solving an inhomogeneous system of linear ODEs and finding a Green's matrix from www.exampleproblems.com.

Ordinary differential equations
Matrices